The terms marketers and advertisers encompass a vast number of fields and individuals. This list includes notable authors of books on marketing and/or advertising.

David Aaker
Marty Appel
Edward Bernays
Leonard Berry (professor)
Chris Brogan
Leo Burnett
Jack Canfield
Joel Comm
Stephen Covey
Roberto Duailibi
Seth Godin
Timothy R. Hawthorne
Tom Hayes (author)
John Hegarty (advertising executive)
Claude C. Hopkins
Philip Kotler
Jay Conrad Levinson
Paul Margulies
David Ogilvy
Bryan Pearson (businessman)
Al Ries
David Meerman Scott
Brian Solis
Jack Trout
Jeff Zabin

See also
Lists of writers

Lists of writers
 Business writers
Advertising-related lists
Marketing-related lists

ja:ノンフィクション作家